The Historic Eagles Theatre is located at 106 W Market Street in the city of Wabash, Indiana.

History 
Originally opened in 1905, the Eagles Theatre was built as a vaudeville theater, but switched to movies by the 1930s when it was redecorated in the Art Deco style. The Eagles boasts one of the largest screens remaining in Indiana, has two balconies and a ballroom. The Theatre was added to the National Register of Historic Places in 1985.

On September 4, 2017, the 111-year old Eagles Theatre suspended operations to begin construction on the Renovation Project, a two-year transformation to revitalize the entire building.

References

Theatres in Indiana
Wabash, Indiana